Coo-Coo 043 is a 2022 Taiwanese drama film written and directed by Chan Ching-lin. Set in the world of pigeon racing, it revolves around a struggling family who relies on the sport for a living, as they face the threat of an economic downturn and the disappearance of their son. It was selected as the opening film of the 2022 Taipei Golden Horse Film Festival.

It won Best Narrative Feature at the 59th Golden Horse Awards.

Cast
 Yu An-shun as Ching
 Yang Li-yin as Min
 Hu Jhih-ciang as Hsiao-hu
 Rimong Ihwar as Meng-lu
 Yang Ching-huang as Priest

Production
Coo-Coo 043 was chosen as one of the Golden Horse Film Project Promotion Work-In-Progress Projects in 2021. It is the follow-up work to Chan's debut feature The Island That All Flow By which scored Best New Director and Best Leading Actress nominations at the 54th Golden Horse Awards. Chan was also previously nominated for Golden Horse Award for Best Live Action Short Film for A Breath from the Bottom in 2013.

Awards and nominations

References

External links
 

2022 films
2022 drama films
Taiwanese drama films
2020s Mandarin-language films
Taiwanese-language films
Works about pigeon racing